The Best of Bob Dylan is a single-disc compilation album containing songs by Bob Dylan, released on November 15, 2005.
The Best of Bob Dylan is available in a digipak format, in an attempt to imitate a vinyl record. The album has liner notes written by Bill Flanagan, with commentary on each of the album's tracks.

Track listing

References

External links
 
 http://www.searchingforagem.com/2000s/International049.htm

2005 greatest hits albums
Albums produced by Barry Beckett
Albums produced by Bob Dylan
Albums produced by Bob Johnston
Albums produced by Daniel Lanois
Albums produced by Don DeVito
Albums produced by Jerry Wexler
Albums produced by John Hammond (producer)
Albums produced by Mark Knopfler
Albums produced by Tom Wilson (record producer)
Bob Dylan compilation albums
Columbia Records compilation albums